Eight Eccentrics of Yangzhou is the name for a group of eight Chinese painters active in the eighteenth-century, who were known in the Qing Dynasty for rejecting the orthodox ideas about painting in favor of a style deemed expressive and individualist.

The term was also used because they each had strong personalities at variance with the conventions of their own time. Most of them were from impoverished or troubled backgrounds. Still the term is, generally, more a statement about their artistic style than any social eccentricities.

The eight had an influence and association with painters like Gao Fenghan, as well as several others.

The Eight

The generally accepted list is:
Wāng ShìShèn (汪士慎) (1686–1759)
Huáng Shèn (黄慎) (1687–1768)
Lĭ Shàn (李鱓/李鳝) (1686?–1756)
Jīn Nóng (金农) (1687–1764)
Luō Pìn (罗聘) (1733–1799)
Gāo Xiáng (高翔) (1688–1753)
Zhèng Xiè (郑燮), also known as Zhèng BănQiáo (郑板桥) (1693–1765)
Lĭ FāngYīng (李方膺) (1696–1755)

Alternate lists include:
Huang Shen, Li Shan, Jin Nong, Zheng Xie, Li Fangying, Gao Fenghan, Bian Shoumin, Yang Fa
Wang Shishen, Huang Shen, Li Shan, Jin Nong, Luo Pin, Zheng Xie, Min Zhen, Gao Fenghan

See also
 Xu Wei
 Yangzhou

Notes

References
 Ci hai bian ji wei yuan hui. Ci hai. Shanghai: Shanghai ci shu chu ban she, 1979.

External links

Yangzhou University
lclark.edu
China Culture

Qing dynasty painters
People from Yangzhou